Shah Khalil Allah III (‎; 1740–1817) was the 45th Imam of the Nizari Ismaili Shia Islam community. Khalilullah Ali III was born in 1740 in the city of Kirman. His upbringing in Mahallat began under the care of his uncle, Mirza Muhammad Bakir at the age of two years, and got rudiments of his formal education at home. In 1792 he succeeded his father Abū-l-Ḥasan ‘Alī ibn Qāsim ‘Alī, for whom he was his eldest son. He moved the seat of the Imamate from Kirman to Kahak, from where he led for 20 years. His name of Shah Khalil Allah was a Ni'matullāhī Sufi name, which reflected the close relationship between the Nizaris and Ni'matullāhīs. In 1815 Shāh Khalīlullāh moved to Yazd in order to be closer to his Indian followers.

Death and succession 
Shāh Khalīlullāh died at the age of 77 in 1817 (along with several followers) as a result of a fanatical Twelver Shia cleric called Mulla Husayn Yazdi inciting a Twelver mob to attack the Imam's house as a follow up to a dispute between some Nizaris and some Twelver shopkeepers. However, Yazdi's real aim may have been to weaken the spreading influence of the Nizaris. The Imam's house was also plundered in the attack. Mulla Husayn Yazdi was punished for his actions by Fat′h-Ali Shah Qajar (the second Qajar king of Iran), since the king and the Imam had been on good terms.

The Imam was buried in the holy city of Najaf, Iraq, in a mausoleum that also contains the bodies of some of his relatives and descendants. The Imam was the last to have spent his entire Imamate in Persia. He was succeeded by his eldest son Shāh Ḥassan ‘Alī, who was the first Nizari Imam to use the title Aga Khan- a trend which has continued to the present day.

Following the Imams death, the Ismailis of Iran were in a strong enough position to finally come out publicly and cease their use of Taqiyya, which had been in force for over 500 years.

References

Sources

 

Nizari imams
Iranian Ismailis
Assassinated Shia imams
1740 births
1817 deaths
18th-century Ismailis
19th-century Ismailis